Sándor Reményik (30 August 1890, in Kolozsvár – 24 October 1941, in Kolozsvár) was a Hungarian poet.

Life 
Sándor Reményik was born on 30 August 1890 in Kolozsvár, Austria-Hungary (now Cluj-Napoca, Romania) to a wealthy architect. After he finished high school in Kolozsvár, he began studying to become a lawyer until an eye disease ended his aspirations.

Works 
 Mistletoe (1918)
 Until death (1918)
 Only like that (1920)
 Verses of a border castle (1921)
 Whispers of wild water (1921)
 An idea comes (1925)
 The bells of Atlantis ring (1927)
 Front of the lamp (1927)
 Instead of bread (1927)
 Flower in ruins (1935)
 High tension (1940)
 Complete verses (1941)
 Completed (1942), contained posthumously unpublished verses
 Complete verses (1944)
 Snow cross (2005)

References

External links 
 Some of his works (mp3)
 
 

1890 births
1941 deaths
Writers from Cluj-Napoca
Hungarian Lutherans
Hungarian male poets
20th-century Hungarian poets
20th-century Hungarian male writers
20th-century Lutherans